Ap Chau Pak Tun Pai is a small island in the New Territories of Hong Kong. It is located in Ap Chau Bay to the west of Ap Chau and is not to be confused with Ap Chau Mei Pak Tun Pai which is located closer to Ap Chau. It is under the administration of North District.

References

Uninhabited islands of Hong Kong
North District, Hong Kong
Islands of Hong Kong